William John Brereton (1786 – 1851) was an English first-class cricketer who played in one first-class cricket match for Norfolk in 1820.

References

English cricketers
English cricketers of 1787 to 1825
Norfolk cricketers
1786 births
1851 deaths
People from Brinton, Norfolk
Sportspeople from Norfolk